Donald Lee Cline (born December 10, 1938) is a convicted felon and an American former medical doctor of obstetrics and gynaecology. It is believed that between 1974 and 1987, Cline conceived numerous children without disclosing himself as the sperm donor to his patients. As of May 11, 2022, Cline has been confirmed as the biological father of 94 doctor-conceived offspring.

Education and career
Cline received his undergraduate degree from Indiana University and his M.D. from Indiana University School of Medicine. After interning at Indiana University Health Methodist Hospital, he served two years in the Air Force and 12 years as inactive reserve. In 1979, Cline opened his clinic on 2020 West 86th Street in Indianapolis and specialized in reproductive endocrinology & infertility. He practiced there until retiring in 2009. Following his felony conviction in 2018, Cline surrendered his medical license. He is prohibited from reinstatement by the Medical Licensing Board of Indiana.

Fertility fraud
In 2014 when Jacoba Ballard, a daughter of a former patient of Dr. Cline, reviewed the results of her at-home DNA test, she discovered a biological connection to eight previously unknown half-siblings. Her genetic genealogy research ultimately revealed Cline, her mother's fertility doctor, as her biological father. Cline is now known to have covertly fathered at least 94 offspring.

Investigations and litigation
Ballard filed a complaint with the Attorney General of Indiana who initiated an investigation in 2015. Then Indiana attorney general Tim DeLaney declined to prosecute because "there was no law forbidding Cline’s conduct." Ballard then pursued media coverage. Fox59 anchor Angela Ganote investigated her story. During her investigation, Ganote learned that Cline had lied to the attorney general's office in their investigation. Documents show that he had told investigators, "I can emphatically say that at no time did I ever use my own sample for insemination nor was I a donor."   

After a story aired on Fox59, Cline left a voicemail for Ballard contradicting what he had told investigators. "Uh, this is Dr. Cline, You know, I thought I was doing the right thing. I only donated my own sample nine or 10 times," he said. He had placed the call to ask Ballard for help with damage control. "Um, my wife and I, uh, after 57 years of marriage, um, we have had a great deal of problems over this. She considers this adultery. I donated my sample. Gonna lose my wife. Our marriage will be over. Can you help?" 

Ganote told DeLaney that Cline was lying to them. Ballard played the audio of the voice mail. The attorney general then conducted an independent DNA test. The results confirmed a 99.9997% probability of paternity. Charges were filed against Cline. In State of Indiana v. Donald Cline, Cline pleaded guilty to two Level 6 felony counts of obstruction of justice and received a one-year suspended sentence. 

On November 30, 2016, Elizabeth White and son Matthew White filed a proposed complaint for damages and demand for jury trial with the State of Indiana Department of Insurance. The proposed complaint cites negligence, constructive fraud, battery, breach of contract, breach of express warranty, and negligent hiring or retention as to defendant and reproductive endocrinology associates. They then filed a multi-count complaint in Marion Superior Court. Cline's motion to dismiss was denied. In an interlocutory appeal, a panel of Indiana Court of Appeals affirmed the lower court's decision, finding that "Matthew sufficiently stated breach of contract and tort claims for which relief can be granted."

As of May 2022, Cline had paid out more than $1.35 million to settle three civil lawsuits filed by donor children and families. Three more are pending.

List of Cline court cases

Legislation
The Cline fertility fraud and similar doctor-donated sperm cases exposed a lack of legislation specific to infertility patients' and their children's rights. Ballard lobbied the state of Indiana for change. On May 17, 2019, Indiana became the first state to designate fertility fraud as a Level 6 felony. S.E.A. 174, P.L. 215 became effective July 1, 2019. It reads:
Establishes a cause of action for civil fertility fraud and provides that a prevailing plaintiff may be awarded: (1) compensatory and punitive damages; or (2) liquidated damages of $10,000. Specifies the statute of limitations for civil fertility fraud. Increases the penalty for deception involving the identity of a person or the identity or quantity of property to a Level 6 felony if the offense involves a misrepresentation relating to: (1) a medical procedure, device, or drug; and (2) human reproductive material. Urges the legislative council to assign the topic of fertility laws, including gestational surrogacy, to an appropriate study committee.

States which have enacted legislation: Arizona, Arkansas, California, Colorado, Florida, Indiana, Iowa, Texas, Utah

States proposing legislation: Michigan, Nebraska, New York, Ohio, Kentucky, Oregon, Pennsylvania, Washington

There is no Federal legislation specifically applicable to fertility fraud.

Effect on Cline's patients and their children

Genetic health concerns 
There is a high presence of auto-immune disorders among Cline's donor-fathered children. Cline's own auto-immune condition, rheumatoid arthritis, would have excluded him as an eligible sperm donor at his own clinic.

Many of the donor-children live within a 25-mile radius of each other. Their concern with consanguinity and its potential genetic disorders increases as their own children grow up and develop intimate relationships. In an extended profile piece in The Atlantic, reporter Sarah Zhang wrote:
The donor children have begun cataloging the ways their own paths have crossed, too. White went to Purdue at the same time as one of his half brothers. One sibling sold another a wagon at a garage sale. Two of them lived on the same street. Two had kids on the same softball team. They’re worried that their children are getting old enough to date soon. 'Did you not consider we all live in a relatively close area?' one sister said she has wondered about Cline. 'Did you really think … that we wouldn’t meet? That we wouldn’t maybe date? That we wouldn’t have kids who might date? Did you never consider that?' Cline now looms over their kids’ every innocent crush, their every prom date.

Impact statements
Todd Foster, donor child: "It was like this gut punch. Someone just cut the tether to who I am. Because we’re all taught our identity resides in our blood, right? That’s why I took the damn DNA test. But yeah, this complete feeling like my whole identity, is that gone? Am I no longer a Foster? I literally had to just rest my hand and kind of sit there for a minute. Just like, woah. The weight of it. I woke up the next morning and, again, excuse my language but just kind of like, what the fuck?! This cannot be real. This is … what? And I think it was that way for a couple of weeks."

Julie Manes, donor child: "It's devastating. It's changed my entire life. I've cried every day for the past two months. It's devastating to say the least. I believed for 34 years that my dad was my father. And he still is, but knowing that Cline did this is...horrible."

Elizabeth White, mother: "My first words were, 'I was raped 15 times, and I didn’t even know it.'"

In media
Donald Cline's fertility fraud is the subject of a Netflix documentary titled Our Father which premiered in May 2022.

Personal life
Cline has two children with his wife, Audrey, in addition to 94 other children conceived by artificially inseminating women with his own sperm without their knowledge or consent.

See also 
 Fertility fraud
 Bernard Norman Barwin
 Cecil Jacobson
 List of people with the most children
 Quiverfull

Notes

Citations

External links

Living people
1938 births
Medical malpractice
Sperm donors
Sperm donation
American gynecologists
People convicted of obstruction of justice